The women's basketball tournament at the 2012 Olympic Games in London began on 28 July and ended on 11 August. All preliminary and quarterfinal games were held at the Basketball Arena within the Olympic Park, and the semifinal and the medal games were held at the North Greenwich Arena (renamed from The O2 Arena due to the no commercialization policy).

Qualification

Squads

Competition format
Twelve qualified nations were drawn into two groups, each consisting of six teams. Each game result merits a corresponding point:
*The team has less than two players available to play on the court.**A team cannot present five players at the start of the game, or its actions prevent play from being resumed.
In case teams are tied on points, the tiebreaking criteria are, in order of first application:
Results of the games involving the tied teams (head-to-head records)
Goal average of the games involving the tied teams
Goal average of all of the games played
Points scored
Drawing of lots

The teams with the four best records qualified for the knockout stage, which was a single-elimination tournament. The semifinal winners contested for the gold medal, while the losers played for the bronze medal.

Preliminary round
All times are British Summer Time (UTC+1).

Group A

Group B

Knockout round

Quarterfinals

Semifinals

Bronze medal game

Gold medal game

Statistical leaders

Individual tournament highs

Points

Rebounds

Assists

Blocks

Steals

Team tournament highs

Offensive PPG

Rebounds

Assists

Steals

Blocks

See also
 Men's Tournament

References

External links
Schedule 

 
2012
Women's basketball
International women's basketball competitions hosted by the United Kingdom
2012 in women's basketball
Women's events at the 2012 Summer Olympics